Caledonia is a village in Racine County, Wisconsin, United States. The population was 25,361 at the 2020 census. The residential community of Franksville is located within the village. Franksville is a former census-designated place. The residential neighborhood of Husher is also located within the village.

History
Prior to January 2006, Caledonia was a town. After the state government denied Caledonia's request to become a village, the state legislature enacted a special exemption, allowing Caledonia to proceed. A referendum in 2005 allowed Caledonia to become a village.

Geography

Demographics

2010 census
As of the census of 2010, there were 24,705 people, 9,629 households, and 7,187 families living in the village. The racial makeup of the village was 91.7% White, 2.8% African American, 0.4% Native American, 1.8% Asian, 1.5% from other races, and 1.8% from two or more races. Hispanic or Latino of any race were 5.3% of the population.

There were 9,629 households, of which 31.1% had children under the age of 18 living with them, 63.6% were married couples living together, 7.0% had a female householder with no husband present, 4.1% had a male householder with no wife present, and 25.4% were non-families. 20.3% of all households were made up of individuals, and 8.4% had someone living alone who was 65 years of age or older. The average household size was 2.55 and the average family size was 2.94.

The median age in the village was 43.5 years. 22.6% of residents were under the age of 18; 6.5% were between the ages of 18 and 24; 23.2% were from 25 to 44; 33.3% were from 45 to 64; and 14.4% were 65 years of age or older. The gender makeup of the village was 49.7% male and 50.3% female.

2000 census
As of the census of 2000, there were 23,614 people, 8,549 households, and 6,805 families living in the town. The population density was 519.1 people per square mile (200.4/km2). There were 8,839 housing units at an average density of 194.3 per square mile (75.0/km2). The racial makeup of the town was 94.18% White, 1.99% African American, 0.42% Native American, 1.27% Asian, 0.05% Pacific Islander, 0.91% from other races, and 1.18% from two or more races. Hispanic or Latino of any race were 3.12% of the population.

There were 8,549 households, out of which 36.7% had children under the age of 18 living with them, 69.4% were married couples living together, 7.2% had a female householder with no husband present, and 20.4% were non-families. 16.1% of all households were made up of individuals, and 5.5% had someone living alone who was 65 years of age or older. The average household size was 2.71 and the average family size was 3.04.

In the town the population was spread out, with 26.0% under the age of 18, 6.5% from 18 to 24, 30.0% from 25 to 44, 26.7% from 45 to 64, and 10.8% who were 65 years of age or older. The median age was 38 years. For every 100 females, there were 99.8 males. For every 100 females age 18 and over, there were 97.8 males.

The median income for a household in the town was $61,647, and the median income for a family was $68,043. Males had a median income of $46,939 versus $30,859 for females. The per capita income for the town was $26,031. About 2.1% of families and 3.6% of the population were below the poverty line, including 3.1% of those under age 18 and 10.0% of those age 65 or over.

Education

Caledonia is part of Racine Unified School District. Schools serving sections of Caledonia for elementary school, all in Caledonia, include Gifford K–8 School, Olympia Brown Elementary School, and North Park Elementary School. K–8 schools serving sections for middle school include Gifford K–8 and Jerstad-Agerholm K–8 School, the latter in Racine. Senior high schools serving sections of Caledonia include J.I. Case High School in Mount Pleasant and Horlick High School in Racine. Previously Gilmore Middle School in Racine served a section of Caledonia. The R.E.A.L. School in Sturtevant and Walden III Green School in Racine are magnet 6–12 schools serving the area.

Religious private schools in the area include Saint Rita School (K–8) of the Roman Catholic Archdiocese of Milwaukee, in Caledonia; and Trinity Lutheran School (K–8) in Racine.

Secession movement

There has been an effort to separate into a local independent school district since 2008, culminating in a referendum in April, 2015, which narrowly passed, asking the village to pursue the feasibility of a separation.

Before the referendum, Caledonia's state senator, Van H. Wanggaard suggested that changes could be made to state law which would enable Caledonia (and the village of Sturtevant, which also passed a referendum to pursue separation) to legally separate from the school district.  Instead, Wanggaard, along with State Representative Tom Weatherston, proposed that the school district should be divided into territorial districts, rather than electing all of its members to at-large seats.  That measure passed into law in Wisconsin's 2015 budget, and the districts adopted ensure that Caledonia and Sturtevant will each have at least one school board representative.  "I see this as a better solution than busting Unified up with Caledonia, Sturtevant and Mount Pleasant leaving it," Weatherston said.

However, the issue was not completely settled.  In 2017, the Republican state government passed, as part of the biennial budget, the Opportunity Schools and Partnership Program (OSPP).  Under the program, if a school district received a failing grade from the state for two consecutive years, a special commissioner would be appointed to draw a new district for the failing schools, and municipalities within the existing district would be empowered to hold a binding referendum on separation from the district.  There were no public hearings on the OSPP.

In 2017, however, Racine Unified School District received a passing grade, meaning that a referendum on separation would not be possible under the law until 2020 at the earliest.

In 2018, the Wisconsin Department of Public Instruction and State Superintendent Tony Evers—who was also, at the time, the Democratic candidate for Governor of Wisconsin—recommended the full repeal of the Opportunity Schools and Partnership Program.  Evers won the 2018 election and became the 46th Governor of Wisconsin.

Notable people

 Marcel Dandeneau (1931–2017), Wisconsin teacher and state legislator, lived in Caledonia; he served on the Caledonia town board and as chairman of the town board

See also
 List of villages in Wisconsin

References

External links

 

Villages in Racine County, Wisconsin
Villages in Wisconsin
Populated places established in 2006